Anne Bascove (born 1946), commonly credited by the mononym Bascove, is an American artist. She's a painter, printmaker, and creates collages.

Biography
Bascove was born in Philadelphia, Pennsylvania. She received her B.A. from the University of the Arts in Philadelphia.  She currently resides in New York City.

Bascove has also worked with many literary figures, among them Robertson Davies, Jerome Charyn, and T. Coraghessan Boyle. Her covers for Vintage Books in the 1980s included the novel Jakob von Gunten and Selected Stories by Robert Walser, and she illustrated the cover for William Goyen's Had I A Hundred Mouths for Clarkson N. Potter in a similar style.

She has edited three collections of her paintings with related writings Sustenance and Desire: A Food Lover's Anthology of Sensuality and Humor (2004), Where Books Fall Open: A Reader's Anthology of Wit & Passion (2001) and Stone and Steel: Paintings and Writings Celebrating the Bridges of New York City (1998).

Work
Bascove has shown work in solo exhibitions at the Museum of the City of New York, the Anita Shapolsky Gallery in New York, the Arsenal in Central Park, the Municipal Art Society, the Hudson River Museum, NYU Fales Library, and The National Arts Club.

Bascove is also well known for her series of painting and drawings of the bridges of New York City. She makes a point of learning about the history of the bridges that she paints or draws and she works from photographic references. She and her husband, architect Michael Avramides, drove around the bridges and took pictures of as many different angles as possible. Her paintings of bridges are full of vivid colors and have been called "jewel-toned."

Bascove has worked with The New York, Brooklyn, and Roosevelt Island Historical Societies, and has lectured and arranged events with the Museum of the City of New York, the Central Park Conservancy, the New York City Department of Parks and Recreation, the Municipal Art Society, NYU Fales Library, and the Hudson River Museum.

Bascove's work can be found in numerous private and public collections, including: the Museum of the City of New York, the MTA Arts for Transit, the Pennsylvania Academy of the Fine Arts, the Rachofsky Collection, Mount Sinai School of Medicine, the Noble Maritime Collection, the Harry Ransom Collection, University of Texas at Austin, The New York Public Library, Berg Collection, the Norwalk Transit District, Time Warner, the Oresman Collection, Wittliff Collections, Texas State University and the Musée of Cherbourg.

References

External links
 
 http://www.acagalleries.com/

1946 births
Living people
20th-century American painters
20th-century American printmakers
20th-century American women artists
21st-century American painters
21st-century American printmakers
21st-century American women artists
American women painters
American women printmakers
Artists from Philadelphia
American illustrators
Collage artists
University of the Arts (Philadelphia) alumni